Thiruppugal (Tamil: , , IPA/Tamil: , meaning 'Holy Praise' or 'Divine Glory'), sometimes spelled Thiruppugazh, is a 15th-century anthology of Tamil religious songs dedicated to Murugan, the son of Shiva, written by the poet-saint Arunagirinathar (Tamil: ,). The anthology is considered one of the central works of medieval Tamil literature, both for its poetical and musical qualities, and for its religious, moral and philosophical content.

The work and its contents

There are no historical records of the life of Arunagirinathar, and what we know of the composition of the Thiruppugal is largely derived from oral traditions and legends recorded in commentaries on the work. According to these, Arunagirinathar led a hedonistic life as a young man. His disgust at his own conduct led him to attempt suicide by jumping off the temple tower at Thiruvannamalai. He was saved by Murugan himself. Arunagirinathar was transformed, and began a long pilgrimage, visiting the Arupadai Veedu (Six Abodes of Murugan), the six temples most sacred to Murugan, and over 200 other holy shrines in India and Sri Lanka. At each of these, he composed songs in praise of Murugan, which are collected together in the Thiruppugal. The majority of the songs are sung to Murugan, but there are also a few songs that sing of deeds of Siva or the avatars of Vishnu, and of the power of Parvati. Almost all songs end addressing Murugan as Perumal, a term that traditionally had strong associations with Tamil Vaishnavism.

The worship of Murugan has strong roots in Tamil Nadu. According to Tamil legends, Murugan was the brave warrior who defeated the powerful demon Soorapadman, and was seen as being the epitome of youth, compassion and beauty. Arunagirinathar's songs build on this tradition, hailing Murugan as the source of all knowledge, who even gave saintly advice to his father, Shiva.  Murugan is described as being full of love and compassion. Arunagirinathar says in the Thiruppugal the songs will, by the grace of Murugan, convey the pearls of devotion and wisdom. The songs contain philosophical musings on God, expressed in simple terms, placing particular emphasis on the role of God's grace or mercy in helping the individual deal with the troubles and ills that afflict humanity. The songs also deal with issues of morality and living a virtuous life on Earth, with many exhorting people to seek true happiness in God.

Language and style 

Early medieval Tamil religious poems were written in a language and style that followed the pattern of classical Tamil literature.  The Thiruppugal, in contrast, was written in a form of Tamil that was quite different from pure classical Tamil.  Its metres, too, are more obviously rhythmical than the stylised classical metres.

The Thiruppugal makes extensive and deliberate use of the imagery associated with the five landscapes of classical akam poetry.  The usage is not, however, straightforward.  Whereas akam poetry uses the imagery in the context of secular, sensuous love, the Thiruppugal uses the same imagery in the context of the longing of the individual for God.  The imagery used in the following verse is illustrative of this usage:

I do not wish to dwell in this illusory body,built of the sky, water, earth, air, fire and desires. Enlighten me, that I may praise the glory of your holy name in the wise, beautiful Tamil tongue, O Lord of the celestial heavens who protects the Kurava woman of the sweet, child-like words who wields the spear which destroyed the majestic hill and wears a garland of scarlet flowers where bees dance seeking honey. (Song 1304)

The reference to Kuravas and hills, and the imagery of the bees making honey from scarlet  flowers, are characteristic of the  landscape.  In secular poetry, the image of bees entering flowers symbolises the clandestine union of lovers, and the backdrop of the hills calls to mind the raw forces of nature.  The union which Arunagirinathar uses this to symbolise, however, is that of the soul with God, and the imagery specifically calls to mind the legend of Murugan's wooing of Valli, the daughter of a Kurava chief.  This appropriation of secular imagery to religious purposes is characteristic of the Thiruppugal: just as it call people to turn from hedonistic pleasures to a life centred on God, it turns the language formerly used to celebrate carnal love to celebrate God.

Musical poems

The poet Arunagirinathar represents a remarkable blend of Tamil literary genius, devotion to Murugan and musical expertise. Although music had always been an integral part of the Tamil hymns such as Tevaram, Arunagirinathar was one of the first to set all his compositions to music in the style of "Santham"—setting the verses within a certain length to conform with rhythm (thala). Arunagirinathar utilises certain repetitive phrases to achieve movement and colour in his poems. At the beginning of each poem in the Thiruppugal, Arunagirinathar gives the rhythm notations.

Arunagiri's poems can be enjoyed for their literary value as well as for their devotional. Arunagirinathar has combined his poetic skill and his devotion towards Muruga with remarkable ease.  
Scholars hail Thiruppugal both as a literary masterpiece and as a work of devotion.

Arunagiri was not a born poet nor a devotee but rather started out in a different way of life and transformed himself into an erudite scholar and versatile poet. (Arunagirinathar describes this in Kandhar Anuputhi) (The Adoration to God) thus: "This talent, this skill, this knowledge and this devotion, do not belong to me.  These are the gifts of Muruga. It is only you, Lord Muruga, who make me sing."  ("Yaam Odhiya Kalviyum Em Arivum Thame Pera Velavar Thandhadhanal").

Arunagiri has woven a beautiful garland, made not of fragrant flowers (Poomalai) but of beautiful verses of Tamil and has presented it to all so that they also could offer it to the Lord and derive immense inspiration, knowledge and blessings from Him. Thiruppugal is an ideal form of prayer, a beautiful set of songs, a panacea for all ills and above all a way of life.

See also
Muruga
Six Abodes of Lord Muruga
Valli
Deivayanai
Arunagirinathar

References

External links
 Full text of the anthology (pdf) from Project Madurai
 Thiruppugal in Tamil and English with meaning from Kaumaram website.

Tamil-language literature
Kaumaram
Tamil Hindu literature